Richard Essington Shields (born July 27, 1982) is an American former professional basketball player. Standing at 6'4" (1.93 m) he played the shooting guard position.

External links
 Richard Shields at adriaticbasket.info 
 Richard Shields at eurobasket.com

1982 births
Living people
ABA League players
African-American basketball players
American expatriate basketball people in Germany
American expatriate basketball people in Greece
American expatriate basketball people in Poland
American expatriate basketball people in Slovenia
American expatriate basketball people in Turkey
American men's basketball players
Basketball players from Maryland
Florida Flame players
Kavala B.C. players
KK Krka players
Mitteldeutscher BC players
Rutgers Scarlet Knights men's basketball players
Shooting guards
TED Ankara Kolejliler players
Hargrave Military Academy alumni
21st-century African-American sportspeople
20th-century African-American people
Helios Suns players